Nicki is a given name, and may refer to:

Film and television 
 Nicki Aycox (1975-2022), American actress best known for her roles as Syl on the series Dark Angel and Stella Vessey on the dramedy Ed
 Nicki Chapman (born 1967), English television presenter who also works in the British pop music industry
 Nicki Clyne (born 1983), Canadian actress
 Nicki Hunter, American pornographic actress and director
 Nicki Paull, Australian actress
 Nicki Shields, English television presenter who also works as the Formula E pit lane reporter

Other 
 Nicki (singer), stage name of German pop singer Doris Andrea Hrda (born 1966)
 Nicki French (born 1964), English singer and dancer
 Nicki McNelly (born 1962), British Anglican priest
 Nicki Minaj (born 1982), Trinidadian rapper and singer
 Nicki Sørensen (born 1975), Danish male professional road bicycle racer

See also
 Nichi
 Nicky
 Nickie
 Nicci (disambiguation)
 Nikki (disambiguation)

English feminine given names
English unisex given names
Unisex given names